Berg en Dal (literally in English: Mountain and Valley) is a municipality in the eastern Netherlands, in the province of Gelderland. It was formed through a merger of the municipalities of Groesbeek, Millingen aan de Rijn and Ubbergen in 2015. The resulting larger municipality maintained the name of Groesbeek until 2016, when it was renamed to Berg en Dal after the village of Berg en Dal.

Berg en Dal has about 34,714 inhabitants and covers an area of about 93 km². The municipality borders in the north on the Waal river and the Bijlands Kanaal, in the east on the German forest of the Reichswald, in the south on the province of Limburg, in the southwest on the forest of the Mookerheide (also Limburg), and in the west on the city of Nijmegen.

Berg en Dal is slightly hilly with altitudes reaching the 75 meters, like the Duivelsberg.

The International Four Days Marches Nijmegen crosses the municipality on the 3rd day (Day of Groesbeek).

Population centres

Politics 
The municipal council exists of 23 members, which are divided as follows:

 CDA, 3 seats
 Groesbeekse Volkspartij (GVP), 3 seats
 Voor Openheid en een Leefbaar Groesbeek (VOLG), 3 seats
 Combinatie'90 (C'90), 2 seats
 Gemeente-, Jeugd- en Sportbelangen (GJS), 2 seats
 GroenLinks, 2 seats
 PvdA, 2 seats
 Sociaal Groesbeek, 2 seats
 Voor Berg en Dal (VBenD), 2 seats
 D66 Berg en Dal, 1 seat
 VVD, 1 seat

CDA, Groesbeekse Volkspartij (GVP), Voor Openheid en een Leefbaar Groesbeek (VOLG), Combinatie'90 (C'90), Gemeente-, Jeugd- en Sportbelangen (GJS), and Voor Berg en Dal (VBenD) have formed a coalition.

The municipal executive consists of mayor Mark Slinkman (CDA) and four aldermen (1 CDA, 1 GVP, 1 C'90, 1 VOLG).

Notable people 

 Anthony Van Egmond (1778 in Groesbeek – 1838) a Dutch Napoleonic War veteran and settler in southwestern Ontario 
 Sebastiaan Tromp (1889 in Beek – 1975) a Dutch Jesuit priest, theologian and Latinist
 Dries van Agt (born 1931 in Geldrop) a retired Dutch politician, Prime Minister of the Netherlands 1977 to 1982
 Baron Berend-Jan van Voorst tot Voorst (born 1944 in Beek) a retired Dutch politician, diplomat and jurist
 Constantijn Kortmann (1944 in Groesbeek – 2016) a Dutch professor of constitutional law
 Marie-Claire "Amber" Cremers (born 1969 in Ubbergen) a Dutch-born German singer/songwriter 
 Sharon Gesthuizen (born 1976) a Dutch politician and trade unionist, grew up in Millingen aan de Rijn
 Bas Eickhout (born 1976 in Groesbeek) a Dutch politician and Member of the European Parliament

Sport 
 Peter Arntz (born 1953 in Leuth) a Dutch retired football midfielder with 411 club caps 
 Jan Peters (born 1954 in Groesbeek) a retired footballer with 380 club caps
 Reza Hormes-Ravenstijn (born 1967 in Beek) a Dutch cyclo-cross racer
 Yelmer Buurman (born 1987 in Ubbergen) a Dutch professional racing driver
 Jasper Cillessen (born 1989) a Dutch professional football goalkeeper, 52 caps for the Netherlands national football team, grew up in Groesbeek

Gallery

References

External links 
  Official website Berg en Dal

 
Municipalities of Gelderland
Municipalities of the Netherlands established in 2016